The following outline is provided as an overview of and topical guide to emergency medicine:

Emergency medicine – medical specialty involving care for undifferentiated, unscheduled patients with acute illnesses or injuries that require immediate medical attention. While not usually providing long-term or continuing care, emergency physicians undertake acute investigations and interventions to resuscitate and stabilize patients. Emergency physicians generally practice in hospital emergency departments, pre-hospital settings via emergency medical services, and intensive care units.

Presentations 
 Abdominal pain
 Altered level of consciousness
 Back pain
 Chest pain
 Coma
 Confusion
 Constipation
 Cyanosis
 Diarrhea
 Dizziness
 Dyspnea
 Fever
 Gastrointestinal bleeding
 Headache
 Hemoptysis
 Jaundice
 Nausea and vomiting
 Pelvic pain
 Seizure
 Sore throat
 Syncope
 Testicular pain
 Vaginal bleeding
 Vertigo
 Weakness

Types of emergencies 

Listed below are conditions that constitute a possible medical emergency and may require immediate first aid, emergency room care, surgery, or care by a physician or nurse. Not all medical emergencies are life-threatening; some conditions require medical attention in order to prevent significant and long-lasting effects on physical or mental health.

Blood 
 Anemia
 Polycythemia
 Acute promyelocytic leukemia
 Disseminated intravascular coagulation

Children 
 Croup
 Limp

Endocrine 
 Acid base disorder
 Diabetes mellitus
 Rhabdomyolysis
 Thyroid storm
 Adrenal crisis
 Addisonian crisis
 Dehydration
 Diabetic coma
 Diabetic ketoacidosis
 Hyperosmolar hyperglycemic state
 Hypoglycemic coma
 Electrolyte disturbance
 Hepatic encephalopathy
 Hypercalcemic crisis
 Lactic acidosis
 Malnutrition and starvation
 Pheochromocytoma

Environmental 
 Accidental hypothermia
 Drowning
 Electric shock and lightning injuries
 Frostbite
 Heat illness
 Radiation injuries
 Scuba diving hazards and dysbarism

Eyes 
 Acute angle-closure glaucoma
 Giant-cell arteritis
 Orbital perforation or penetration
 Retinal detachment

Gastrointestinal 
 Appendicitis
 Biliary colic
 Cholecystitis
 Gastroenteritis
 Small bowel obstruction
 Crohn's disease
 Peritonitis

Genitourinary 
 Acute prostatitis
 Paraphimosis
 Priapism
 Testicular torsion
 Urinary retention
 Kidney failure
 Sexually transmitted infection

Heart and blood vessels 
 Acute coronary syndrome
 Air embolism (arterial)
 Aortic aneurysm (ruptured)
 Abdominal aortic aneurysm
 Aortic dissection
 Bleeding
 Internal bleeding
 Hypovolemia
 Cardiac arrest
 Cardiac arrhythmia
 Ventricular fibrillation
 Supraventricular tachycardia
 Cardiac tamponade
 Deep vein thrombosis
 Heart block
 Heart failure
 Hypertensive emergency
 Infectious endocarditis
 Myocardial infarction (heart attack)
 Myocarditis
 Pericarditis
 Peripheral vascular disease
 Pulmonary embolism
 Valvular heart disease

Infectious disease 
 HIV/AIDS
 Cellulitis
 Necrotizing fasciitis
 Osteomyelitis
 Rabies
 Sepsis
Overwhelming post-splenectomy infection
 Septic arthritis
 Tuberculosis
 Meningitis
 Cholera
 Ear infection
 Gas gangrene
 Lyme disease
 Malaria
 Neutropenic sepsis
 Salmonella poisoning

Inflammatory 
 Allergy
 Anaphylaxis
 Arthritis
 Bursitis
 Systemic lupus erythematosus
 Vasculitis

Injury 
 Abdominal trauma
 Nose bleed
 Appendicitis
 Ballistic trauma (gunshot wound)
 Bite
 Blunt trauma
 Bone fracture
 Burns
 Chest trauma
 Child abuse
 Domestic abuse
 Facial trauma
 Flail chest
 Foreign body
 Fulminant colitis
 Head injury
 Hyperthermia (including heat stroke or sunstroke)
 Malignant hyperthermia
 Hypothermia or frostbite
 Intestinal obstruction
 Pancreatitis
 Peritonitis
 Polytrauma
 Ruptured spleen
 Sexual assault
 Spinal disc herniation
 Spinal injury
 Sensorineural hearing loss
 Traumatic brain injury
 Wound

Lungs and airway 
 Agonal breathing
 Asphyxia
 Angioedema
 Choking
 Drowning
 Smoke inhalation
 Asthma
 Chronic obstructive pulmonary disease
 Epiglottitis
 Pleurisy
 Pneumonia
 Pneumothorax
 Pulmonary embolism
 Respiratory failure
 Upper respiratory infection

Nephrology
 Acute kidney injury

Nervous system 
 Spinal-cord injury
 Cerebrovascular accident (stroke)
 Delirium
 Neuroleptic malignant syndrome
 Seizures
Status epilepticus
Epilepsy
 Serotonin syndrome
 Status migrainosus
 Subarachnoid hemorrhage
 Subdural hematoma

Pregnancy 
 Ectopic pregnancy
 Eclampsia
 Pre-eclampsia
 HELLP syndrome
 Fetal distress
 Obstetrical bleeding
 Placental abruption
 Prolapsed cord
 Puerperal sepsis
 Shoulder dystocia
 Uterine rupture

Psychiatric 
 Anxiety
 Attempted suicide
 Excited delirium
 Homicidal ideation
 Mood disorder
 Psychomotor agitation
 Psychotic episode
 Somatoform disorder
 Suicidal ideation
 Thought disorder

Skin 
 Acute urticaria
 Angioedema
 Erythema multiforme major
 Kasabach–Merritt syndrome
 Toxic epidermal necrolysis

Toxicological 

 Overdose
 Acetaminophen overdose
 Aspirin overdose and other NSAIDs
 Poisoning
Beta blocker toxicity
Calcium channel blocker toxicity 
Ethylene glycol poisoning
Food poisoning

Gynecologic 

 Gynecologic hemorrhage
 Ovarian torsion

 Sexual assault (rape)

Emergency medical care 

 First aid
 Golden hour
 Triage

Critical care 
 Acute Care of at-Risk Newborns (ACoRN)
 Airway management
 Care of the Critically Ill Surgical Patient (CCrISP)
 Mechanical ventilation
 Shock
 Resuscitation
 Cardiopulmonary resuscitation (CPR)
 Neonatal Resuscitation Program (NRP)
 Advanced Cardiac Life Support (ACLS)
 Pediatric Advanced Life Support (PALS)
 Advanced Trauma Life Support(ATLS)

Life support 
 Basic life support (BLS)
 Advanced life support
 Advanced cardiac life support (ACLS)
 Advanced trauma life support (ATLS)
 ABC (medicine)
 Pneumothorax
 Pericardial tamponade
 Pediatric Advanced Life Support (PALS)

Environmental medicine 

Environmental medicine
 High altitude medicine
 Travel medicine
 Mass-gathering medicine

Branches of emergency medicine 
 Emergency medical services
 Emergency nursing
 Emergency psychiatry
 International emergency medicine
 Pediatric emergency medicine
 Pre-hospital emergency medicine
 Social emergency medicine

Contributory fields 

Emergency medicine is multidisciplinary – due to the diversity of medical emergencies encountered, emergency medicine relies heavily upon the knowledge and procedures of many medical specialties, including:

 Critical care medicine
 Disaster medicine
 Hospice care
 Hyperbaric medicine
 Pain management
 Palliative care
 Sports medicine
 Ultrasound
 Wilderness medicine

Emergency medical system 
 Emergency telephone number

Emergency medical services 
Emergency medical services
 Ambulance
 Emergency medical dispatch
 Medical Priority Dispatch System (US)
 Computer-aided call handling (US)
 Advanced Medical Priority Dispatch System (UK)
 Emergency medical technician
 Paramedic

Emergency medical facilities 
 Emergency department
 Poison control center
 Trauma center

Emergency medical professionals 
 Emergency physician
 Emergency nurse
 Emergency medical technician
 Paramedic

Tools and equipment 
Emergency medical equipment
 Bag valve mask (BVM)
 Chest tube
 Defibrillation (AED
 ICD)
 Electrocardiogram (ECG/EKG)
 Intraosseous infusion (IO)
 Intravenous therapy (IV)
 Tracheal intubation
 Laryngeal tube
 Combitube
 Nasopharyngeal airway (NPA)
 Oropharyngeal airway (OPA)
 Pocket mask

Drugs 
 Atropine
 Amiodarone
 Dopamine
 Epinephrine / Adrenaline
 Magnesium sulfate
 Hydralazine

History 
 History of the ambulance
 History of emergency medical services

Journals 
 Critical Care Medicine
 Intensive Care Medicine
 Military Medicine
 Shock
 Trauma
 Academic Emergency Medicine
 American Journal of Emergency Medicine
 Annals of Emergency Medicine
 Annals of Intensive Care
 Critical Care Clinics
 Emergency Medicine Australasia
 Emergency Medicine Journal
 Indian Journal of Critical Care Medicine
 Injury Prevention
 Journal of Critical Care
 Journal of Emergencies, Trauma, and Shock
 Journal of Emergency Nursing
 Journal of Injury and Violence Research
 Journal of Intensive Care Medicine
 Pediatric Critical Care Medicine
 Prehospital Emergency Care
 The Journal of Emergency Medicine

Organizations 
 American Board of Emergency Medicine
 American College of Emergency Physicians
 American Osteopathic Board of Emergency Medicine
 Asian Society for Emergency Medicine
 Australasian College for Emergency Medicine
 British Association for Immediate Care
 Canadian Association of Emergency Physicians
 Emergency Nurses Association
 European Resuscitation Council
 European Society of Emergency Medicine
 International Federation for Emergency Medicine
 International Liaison Committee on Resuscitation
 Resuscitation Council
 Royal College of Emergency Medicine

See also 

 Outline of medicine

References

External links 

Emedicine topics

 
Emergency medicine
Emergency medicine